Catherine Spaak (3 April 1945 – 17 April 2022) was a French-born Italian actress and singer who acted in mostly in Italian films with some Hollywood and international productions. She is best known for her roles in the films Il Sorpasso (1962), The Empty Canvas (1963) and The Cat o' Nine Tails (1971).

Early life 
Spaak was born on 3 April 1945 just outside of Paris in Boulogne-Billancourt, Hauts-de-Seine, France, to former actress Claudie Clèves (née Alice Perrier) and Belgian screenwriter Charles Spaak. Her older sister was actress Agnès Spaak. She was also the niece of Belgian politician Paul-Henri Spaak, while her paternal grandmother was Marie Janson Spaak, Belgium's first female member of Parliament.

Initially she wanted to be a ballerina and studied ballet in her youth, until she gave it up after being told she was too tall. Spaak was inspired to be an actress when in the summer of 1955, she accompanied her father to a film set, where she saw Gina Lollobrigida. In response to her parents announcing that they were divorcing and eager to leave the boarding school, Spaak left home at the age of 15 and moved to Italy, where she settled and eventually became a naturalized citizen.

Film career 
Spaak's first role was in the French 13-minute short L'hiver (1959), directed by Jacques Gautier, which was followed by a brief uncredited role in the French prison break film Le Trou (1960), which was directed by Jacques Becker. Spaak's brief appearance in Le Trou caught the eye of a Paris television reporter, and his subsequent interview with her was seen by Sophia Loren who thought that Spaak would be suitable for a major role in Dolci inganni, a film that her producer husband Carlo Ponti was intending to make in Rome. Released in 1960 (and known internationally released as Sweet Deceptions), Spaak's role as a 17-year-old student who has an affair with a middle-aged man bought her to attention of the wider public.

Spaak soon became a teenage star, and between the ages 15 to 18, she was the lead actress in at least 12 movies. In her initial roles, her dialogues were dubbed until she had learnt Italian.
As an adult, Spaak appeared in many comedies and a few dramas from the mid-1960s through the early 1980s. Among her most notable titles are Circle of Love (1964, directed by Roger Vadim), The Man, the Woman and the Money (1965, starring Marcello Mastroianni), The Incredible Army of Brancaleone (1966, written by Age & Scarpelli), Adultery Italian Style (1966).
Her first film role in an American production was as the mistress of an investor who wants to buy a landmark New Orleans hotel in the 1967 release Hotel.

Spaak's next significant role was as a young widow opposite Jean-Louis Trintignant in the 1968 sex comedy The Libertine. This was followed by Diary of a Telephone Operator (1969, with Claudia Cardinale), the giallo film The Cat o' Nine Tails (1971, written and directed by Dario Argento), the nunsploitation film Story of a Cloistered Nun (1973), the controversial comedy My Darling Slave (1973), the Spaghetti Western Take a Hard Ride (1975) opposite Jim Brown and Lee Van Cleef, Sunday Lovers (1980), Miele di donna (1981) and Alice (2010, written and directed by Oreste Crisostomi).

As her film career began to decline in the 1980s, Spaak transitioned to journalism and television. She hosted a popular Italian television talk show called Harem that ran from 1988 to 2002.

Singing career 
In the 1960s and 70s, Spaak also developed a parallel singing career, recording a number of albums. As a singer, she was regarded by some as the Italian equivalent of French chanteuse Françoise Hardy. Spaak recorded some of Hardy's songs in 1963 for the DET label under the direction of Ezio Leoni, who had previously worked with Hardy.

Personal life 

Spaak was married four times. Her first marriage was on 30 January 1963 at the age of 18 to actor Fabrizio Capucci, whom she had met on the set of the film La voglia matta (1962) and with whom she had a daughter, Sabrina.

Following her divorce from Capucci in 1971, Spaak was married from August 1972 to 1979 to Italian entertainer Johnny Dorelli with whom she had a son, Gabriele Guidi.

From 1993 to 2010, she was married to architect Daniel Rey, and from July 2013 to June 2020 to Vladimiro Tuselli.

Death 
Spaak died in Rome on 17 April 2022 at the age of 77, a year after suffering a brain hemorrhage.

Selected filmography 

L'hiver (1959)
Le Trou (1960)
Dolci inganni (1960). Internationally released under the title  Sweet Deceptions.
 Il carro armato dell'8 settembre (1960)
 La voglia matta (1961). Internationally released under the title  Crazy Desire.
 Three Faces of Sin (1961)
 Il Sorpasso (1962)
 Of Wayward Love (1962)
 Eighteen in the Sun (1962)
 The Girl from Parma (1963)
 The Empty Canvas (1963)
 The Warm Life (1963)
 Three Nights of Love (1964)
 Weekend at Dunkirk (1964)
 Circle of Love (1964)
 Made in Italy (1965)
 The Man, the Woman and the Money (1965)
 The Incredible Army of Brancaleone (1965)
 Break Up (1965)
 Madamigella di Maupin (1966)
 Adultery Italian Style (1966)
 Hotel (1967)
 A Complicated Girl (1968)
 The Libertine (1968)
 If It's Tuesday, This Must Be Belgium (1969)
 Diary of a Telephone Operator (1969)
 The Cat o' Nine Tails (1971)
 Ripped Off (1972)
 Cause of Divorce (1972)
 Story of a Cloistered Nun (1973)
 Dear Parents (1973)
 My Darling Slave (1973)
 La via dei babbuini (1974)
 Take a Hard Ride (1975)
 Febbre da cavallo (1976)
 Per vivere meglio, divertitevi con noi (1978)
 Catherine and I (1980)
 Sunday Lovers (1980)
 The Precarious Bank Teller (1980)
 Miele di donna (1981)
 Claretta (1984)
 Secret Scandal (1989)
 Une famille formidable (TV, 1993)
 Alice (2010)
 Zen (TV, 2011)
 La vacanza'' (2019, final film role)

References

External links 

 Official website
 

1945 births
2022 deaths
20th-century Buddhists
21st-century Buddhists
People from Boulogne-Billancourt
French film actresses
French television actresses
Spaghetti Western actresses
Converts to Buddhism
Converts to Buddhism from Christianity
Former Roman Catholics
French Buddhists
Italian Buddhists
French people of Belgian descent
French people of Swedish descent
Italian people of French descent
Italian people of Belgian descent
Italian people of Swedish descent